The Mars Environmental Dynamics Analyzer (MEDA) is an instrument on board the Mars 2020 Perseverance rover that will characterize the dust size and morphology, as well as surface weather.  Specifically, the information obtained will help address future human exploration objectives, as dust sizes and shapes, daily weather report and information on the radiation and wind patterns on Mars, that are critical for proper design of in situ resource utilization systems. MEDA is a follow-on project from REMS, of the Curiosity rover mission. MEDA has an increased scope, with greater data collection on Mars dust which contributes to overall Mars program objectives and discovery goals.

The instrument suite was developed and provided by the Spanish Astrobiology Center at the Spanish National Research Council in Madrid, Spain. On April 8, 2021, NASA reported the first MEDA weather report on Mars: for April 3–4, 2021, the high was "minus-7.6 degrees, and a low of minus-117.4 degrees ... [winds] gusting to ... 22 mph".

Scientific team members 
The Principal Investigator is José Antonio Rodríguez Manfredi and the Deputy Principal Investigator is Manuel de la Torre Juarez (JPL-NASA) 

List of coinvestigators and their affiliations:

Overview

Dust dominates Mars' weather the way that water dominates Earth's weather. Martian weather cannot be predicted unless dust behavior is studied and understood in the weather context. MEDA is a suite of environmental sensors designed to record dust optical properties and six atmospheric parameters: wind speed/direction, pressure, relative humidity, air temperature, ground temperature, and radiation (UV, visible, and IR ranges of the spectrum).

The technology used on MEDA was inherited from the REMS package operating on the Curiosity rover and the TWINS package on InSight lander.  The sensors are located on the rover's mast and on the deck, front and interior of the rover's body.  It records data whether the rover is active or not, at both day and night. The instruments will collect data for 5 minutes every 30 minutes.

Meda components

See also
Martian soil (aka regolith)
Atmosphere of Mars
Materials Adherence Experiment (1996 Mars dust experiment on Mars Pathfinder)

References

External links
 Mars 2020 Home site

Mars 2020 instruments
Meteorological instrumentation and equipment
Space science experiments
INTA spacecraft instruments